is one of the eleven wards in the city of Kyoto, in Kyoto Prefecture, Japan. Its name means "west capital ward" and it is situated on the western edge of the city, to the south of center. The ward was established on October 1, 1976, after it was separated from Ukyō-ku. The Katsura River is the border between Nishikyo-ku and Ukyo-ku.

Katsura Imperial Villa, on that river, is one of the most widely known features of Nishikyo-ku. Saihō-ji, the Moss Temple, is a UNESCO World Heritage Site in the ward.

Matsunoo-taisha, a Shinto shrine, is also located in Nishikyō-ku.

As of October 1, 2021 the ward has an area of 59.24 km² and a population of 148,370.

Demographics

Education

International Research Center for Japanese Studies
Kyoto City University of Arts
Kyoto College of Economics
Katsura Campus, Kyoto University

References

External links

  

Wards of Kyoto